The 52nd edition of the Vuelta a Colombia was held from June 30 to July 14, 2002.

Stages

2002-06-30: Cúcuta — Cúcuta (5.2 km)

2002-07-01: Pamplona — Bucaramanga (142 km)

2002-07-02: Bucaramanga — Socorro (109.1 km)

2002-07-03: Socorro — Tunja (150.7 km)

2002-07-04: Tunja — Chía (115.7 km)

2002-07-05: Bogotá — Bogotá (39 km)

2002-07-06: Bogotá — Bogotá (160.6 km)

2002-07-07: Soacha — Ibagué (194 km)

2002-07-08: Ibagué — Pereira (121.7 km)

2002-07-09: Pereira — Cali (199.5 km)

2002-07-10: Cali — Cali (17 km)

2002-07-11: Buga — Armenia (106.1 km)

2002-07-12: Manizales — Jericó (154 km)

2002-07-13: Jericó — El Escobero (105 km)

2002-07-14: Circuito en Medellín (109.2 km)

Final classification

See also 
 2002 Clásico RCN

References 
 cyclingnews
 pedalear

Vuelta a Colombia
Colombia
Vuelta Colombia